St. John Baptist Church in Wales High School is a church secondary school located in Aberdare, Wales. The school serves children from all over Rhondda Cynon Taf and surrounding counties.

In the summer of 2016, the school was announced as the best school in Rhondda Cynon Taf for 5 A*-C grades at GCSE.

Building and Grounds
The school consists of several buildings in which departments are placed with adjacent classrooms. Within the school, the building is commonly referred to as having two parts, upper school and lower school. This has no relation to the lower, middle and upper year groups. The upper school is the western side of the building consisting of several Science labs, Modern Foreign Languages and mathematics. The lower school, the eastern side of the building, contains all sporting facilities, Religious Studies classrooms, the English department and IT facilities. The reception and offices are also located in the lower school.  The building has expanded several times in recent years with the addition of new sporting facilities and new classrooms with elevators to cater for wheelchair users. The school consists of:
6 Science labs
1 library for all pupils
6 IT rooms (including one Design and Technology IT suite)
Home Economics and Textiles rooms
3 Design and Technology rooms
2 Art rooms and one darkroom
2 Music rooms
6 Modern Foreign Languages rooms (including German, French and Welsh classrooms)
5 English rooms
3 Religious Studies rooms
A sports hall with gym equipment and one gymnasium
A hall and canteen
A Sixth Form canteen/snack kiosk
A Sixth Form study area (including an IT suite and library)
Facilities for disabled pupils

Christianity and Worship
Christianity is a large part of the school life. Every year group attends a Eucharist service at least once per term. These services take place in the school hall, hosted by visiting priests from the diocese of Llandaff and surrounding dioceses, as well as in St Elvan's, a large church situated in Aberdare's town centre. St Elvan's is usually the host for whole-school services and major school events, such as the annual Prize Giving ceremony.

Notably, the school has welcomed iconic members of the Anglican Church through its doors. Rowan Williams, former archbishop of Canterbury, visited the school during 2012 after announcing that he intended to stand down as Archbishop that year. Dr Barry Morgan, Archbishop of Wales, also visited with Rowan Williams.

Notable former and current pupils

Rhys Jones - Team GB Paralympic Athlete - T37 100m and 200m sprint London 2012 Summer Olympics.
Rhys Shellard - Welsh Rugby Union player.
Vikki Howells - Welsh politician
Timmy Burch - TV Show Star/Comedian

References

External links
St John Baptist High School School Website
Main News can be found on http://www.stjohnbaptist.co.uk/moodle/

Secondary schools in Rhondda Cynon Taf
Church in Wales schools
Aberdare